Molecubes are a collection of modular robots created by Hod Lipson and Victor Zykov from Cornell University. A molecube is made of two rotatable halves, one with the microprocessor which represents the intelligence behind the unit, and the other with a motor for rotating the joint. A group of the cubes can be connected into a variety of shapes.

A robot constructed entirely of molecubes would be able to repair itself using extra cubes, and to create a copy of itself using the same number of cubes.  
Physical self-reproduction of both a three- and a four-module robot was demonstrated.  
Subsequent open-source development, with support from Microsoft Research and Festo, 
reduced size and weight of the molecubes.  
Additional molecube types were produced including: hinges, grippers, batteries, wheels, cameras and more.

See also 
Self-reconfiguring modular robot

References

External links 
 Youtube video: Self-replicating blocks from Cornell University
 Youtube video: Festo - Molecubes
 Creative Machines Lab page: Machine self-replication
 GitHub repository: Molecubes - Blueprints, source code and circuit schematics
 molecubes.org website: Detailed build materials and instructions Archived

Modular design
Open-source robots
Multi-robot systems
Self-replicating machines